The Anglican Diocese of Kebbi is one of eleven within the Anglican Province of Kaduna, itself one of 14 provinces within the Church of Nigeria. The current bishop is Edmund Akanya

Notes

Dioceses of the Province of Kaduna
Church of Nigeria dioceses